Kenya and Uganda Railways and Harbours (KURH) ran harbours, railways and lake and river ferries in Kenya Colony and the Uganda Protectorate from 26. February 1926 until 1. May 1948. It included the Uganda Railway, which it extended from Nakuru to Kampala in 1931. In the same year it built a branch line to Mount Kenya.

After 1930 a new KURH steamer, the 860 tonne , established a fortnightly passenger and cargo service between Butiaba on Lake Albert and Kasenyi on Lake George. Sir Winston Churchill said she was "the best library afloat" and Ernest Hemingway called her "magnificence on water". In 1946 the 350-ton stern-wheel paddle steamer  replaced the old Uganda Railway steamer  on the Albert Nile river service between Pakwach in Uganda and Nimule in Sudan.

In 1948 the East African High Commission was formed and KURH was merged with the railways of the Tanganyika Territory. The new East African Railways and Harbours Corporation provided rail, harbour and inland shipping services in all three territories until the High Commission's successor, the East African Community, was dissolved by its member states in 1977.

References

External links
  illustrated description of the railways of Kenya and Uganda

Railway companies of Kenya
Rail transport in East Africa
East Africa
Rail transport in Africa
Water transport in Africa
Ports and harbours in Africa
British Kenya
Uganda Protectorate
Kenya–Uganda relations
Railway companies of Uganda
1926 establishments in the British Empire